Arjun Madathil Ramachandran (born 11 May 1997) is an Indian badminton player. He alongside India men's team won the 2022 Thomas Cup, and also bronze medal at the 2020 Asia Team Championships.

Career 
Arjun began to playing badminton at the age of nine at FACT club in 2008, and moved to the badminton academy at the Regional Sports Centre in Kadavanthra three years later. He was introduced to playing doubles by his coach M. Mohanachandran, and within a year, he completely shifted his focus to doubles. He featured in Kerala team since 2012.

Achievements

BWF World Tour (1 runner-up) 
The BWF World Tour, which was announced on 19 March 2017 and implemented in 2018, is a series of elite badminton tournaments sanctioned by the Badminton World Federation (BWF). The BWF World Tour is divided into levels of World Tour Finals, Super 1000, Super 750, Super 500, Super 300, and the BWF Tour Super 100.

Mixed doubles

BWF International Challenge/Series (9 titles, 5 runners-up) 
Men's doubles

Mixed doubles

  BWF International Challenge tournament
  BWF International Series tournament
  BWF Future Series tournament

BWF Junior International (5 titles, 1 runners-up) 
Boys' doubles

Mixed doubles

  BWF Junior International Grand Prix tournament
  BWF Junior International Challenge tournament
  BWF Junior International Series tournament
  BWF Junior Future Series tournament

References

External links 
 

Living people
1997 births
Sportspeople from Kochi
Racket sportspeople from Kerala
Indian male badminton players